Zheleznodorozhnaya Kazarma 519 km is a rural locality (a station) in Rubtsovsky Selsoviet, Rubtsovsky District, Altai Krai, Russia. The population was 38 as of 2013.

References 

Rural localities in Rubtsovsky District